Rhoicinus is a genus of spiders in the family Trechaleidae. It was first described in 1898 by Simon. , it contains 10 species, all from South America.

Species
Rhoicinus comprises the following species:
Rhoicinus andinus Exline, 1960
Rhoicinus fuscus (Caporiacco, 1947)
Rhoicinus gaujoni Simon, 1898
Rhoicinus  Höfer & Brescovit, 1994
Rhoicinus rothi Exline, 1960
Rhoicinus schlingeri Exline, 1960
Rhoicinus urucu Brescovit & Oliveira, 1994
Rhoicinus wallsi Exline, 1950
Rhoicinus wapleri Simon, 1898
Rhoicinus weyrauchi Exline, 1960

References

Trechaleidae
Araneomorphae genera
Spiders of South America